Chiliile is a commune in Buzău County, Muntenia, Romania. It is composed of seven villages: Budești, Chiliile, Crevelești, Ghiocari, Glodu-Petcari, Poiana Pletari and Trestioara.

Notes

Communes in Buzău County
Localities in Muntenia